They Hate Change is an American hip hop and electronic music duo from Tampa, Florida, consisting of members Vonne Parks and Andre "Dre" Gainey. The duo is known for its diverse array of influences, including hip hop, drum 'n' bass, Chicago footwork, post-punk, prog, grime, krautrock and emo.

History
The members of They Hate Change met as adolescents, when Gainey moved to Tampa from Rochester, New York at the age of twelve. At that time, he moved into the same apartment building as Parks, who at the time was already becoming involved in the local music scene. Gainey took an interest in the local musical styles of Tampa, and began collaborating with Parks to produce beats. Initially, the duo planned for Parks alone to rap over the duo's beats, but both members now rap as well as produce instrumental music. Gainey and Parks also collaboratively DJed at house parties in their teenage years; by incorporating a diverse selection of genres into their DJ sets, the duo began establishing the combination of influences that would go on to define They Hate Change.

The first project released under the They Hate Change name was a 2015 album titled Cycles. The duo continued releasing music prolifically throughout the later 2010s, and began to receive attention from the music press after signing to the record label Jagjaguwar in 2021. On May 13, 2022, They Hate Change released Finally, New, their first album on Jagjaguwar and eighth project overall.

Style and influences
They Hate Change is strongly influenced by genres from British music, such as jungle and happy hardcore; its members describe themselves as Anglophiles. The duo's music is also seen as incorporating the "myriad electronic subgenres" of Florida, such as Miami bass and a Tampa-based hip hop subgenre known as jook. Individual artists that They Hate Change have identified as influences include Goldie, Brian Eno, D Double E, and Dizzee Rascal.

Gainey has named Camp Lo, Rick Ross, Curren$y, Pusha T, and Jay-Z as artists who have influenced his lyrics. Vonne describes their lyrics as inspired by Clipse and Newham Generals.

Discography

Studio albums
Cycles (2015)
Now, And Never Again (2018)
Juices Run Clear (2019)
Finally, New (2022)

EPs
Meters (2017)
Clearwater (2019)
Maneuvers (2020)
666 Central Ave. (2020)

References

African-American musical groups
American musical duos
Hip hop duos
American electronic music duos
Southern hip hop groups